Dawn of Dreams is the debut studio album by avant-garde/progressive/death metal band Pan.Thy.Monium released in 1992. Contrary to popular belief, the tracks do have intended titles, but Swanö instructed Osmose Productions not to release these titles (or any information about the band whatsoever) in the original pressing of the album, so for many years it was believed that the tracks were intended to be untitled. The official titles were not revealed until The Crypt's 2014 vinyl reissue of the album.

Track listing
"RAAGOONSHINNAAH" – 21:49
"EEPITAFFPH" – 5:51
"SIEEGEH" – 4:03
"IV" – 3:06
"ZENOTAFFPH" – 2:42
"AMARAAH" – 4:26
"EKKHOECCE II" – 3:00

Personnel 
Derelict aka Robert "Robban" Karlsson - vocals 
Winter aka Benny Larsson - drums, percussion and violin 
Day DiSyraah aka Dan Swanö - bass, keyboards and effects   
Mourning aka Robert Ivarsson - rhythm guitars  
Äag aka Tom Nouga aka Dag Swanö - lead guitars, organ and baritone Saxophone

External links
Encyclopaedia Metallum page

1992 debut albums
Pan.Thy.Monium albums